The Devil's Dykes (Hungarian: Ördög árok), also known as the Csörsz árka ("Csörsz Ditch") or the Limes Sarmatiae (Latin for "Sarmatian border"), are several lines of Roman fortifications built mostly during the reign of Constantine the Great (306–337), stretching between today's Hungary, Romania and Serbia.

History

The fortifications consisted of a series of defensive earthen ramparts-and-ditches surrounding the plain of the Tisia (Tisza) river. They stretched from Aquincum (within modern Budapest) eastwards along the line of the northern Carpathian mountains to the vicinity of Debrecen, and then southwards to Viminacium (near modern Stari Kostolac).

They were probably designed to protect the Iazyges, a Sarmatian tribe that inhabited the Tisza plain and had been reduced to tributary status by Constantine, from incursions by the surrounding Goths and Gepids.

Some elements of the fortifications, however, date from the 2nd century AD, and probably constituted an earlier defensive line constructed under emperor Marcus Aurelius (ruled 161–180) at the time of the Marcomannic Wars, the previous occasion that the Tisza plain was occupied by the Romans.

The "Limes Sarmatiae" was intended to expand the Roman Limes, and was built at the same time as the Constantine Wall in Wallachia (connected to the Limes Moesiae). It was, however, destroyed after a few years, at the end of the 4th century.

Indeed, in 374 AD, the Quadi, a Germanic tribe in what is now Moravia and Slovakia, resenting the erection of Roman forts of the "Limes Sarmatiae" to the north and east of the Danube in what they considered to be their territory, and further exasperated by the treacherous murder of their king, Gabinius, crossed the river and laid waste to the province of Pannonia.

In 375, emperor Valentinian I retook Pannonia with several legions. After a short campaign that quickly defeated the Quadi, the fortifications of the "Limes Sarmatiae" were repaired. However, during an audience with an embassy from the Quadi at Brigetio on the River Danube (now Szőny in Hungary), the attitude of the envoys so enraged Valentinian that he suffered a stroke while angrily yelling at them, which led to his death 17 November.

Following his death, political infighting and a lack of good leadership in the Roman Empire led to the "Limes Sarmatiae" being overrun and destroyed.

See also 
 Roman Limes
 Limes Moesiae
 Brazda lui Novac
 Wall of Constantine in Constantinople
 Deil's Dyke – A linear earthwork in south-west Scotland.

Notes

References

Garam Éva-Patay Pál-Soproni Sándor: Sarmatischen Wallsystem im Karpatenbecken, Régészeti Füzetek Ser. II. No. 23., Magyar Nemzeti Múzeum, Budapest, 1983, 2003.
Istvanovits Eszter: The history and perspectives of the research of the Csörsz Ditch.XVIIIth International Congress of Roman Frontier Studies. Amman, 2000.
Patay Pál: Neuere Ergebnisse in der topographischen Untersuchung der Erdwalle in der Tiefebene, Móra Ferenc Múzeum Évkönyve, Szeged, 1969/2
Penguin Atlas of the Roman World (1995)
Soproni Sándor: Limes sarmatiae. Archeológia Értesítő 96., Budapest, 1996 p. 43–52.

Roman fortifications in Romania
Roman fortifications in Serbia
Roman fortifications in Hungary
Roman frontiers
Roman fortifications in Pannonia Inferior
Ancient dikes
Linear earthworks